Graham Coughlan (born 18 November 1974) is an Irish professional football manager and former player who played as a centre back. He is currently manager of EFL League Two club Newport County.

Coughlan began his career in his native Ireland with Bray Wanderers, before being signed by Blackburn Rovers. He joined Livingston in 1999 and his performances for the Scottish club led to a transfer to Plymouth Argyle two years later. He was an integral member of the squad that won two Football League divisional championships between 2002 and 2004, and was a favourite among supporters for his uncompromising style of play at the heart of their defence. Coughlan joined Sheffield Wednesday in 2005, before dropping down to League Two to play for Rotherham United. He moved on to Shrewsbury Town a year later and combined playing duties with coaching their young players. He signed for Southend United in July 2010, taking up a coaching position at the club in 2013, before going on to manage Bristol Rovers and Mansfield Town.

Playing career

Early years
Coughlan started his playing career at Leinster Senior League side Cherry Orchard, he then briefly moved to League of Ireland club Bray Wanderers. At 21, he was brought to England by then Blackburn Rovers manager Ray Harford but struggled to earn a place in the Premier League Champions' first team. Loan spells at Swindon Town and Livingston followed before he made a permanent move to the Scottish club in the Summer of 1999 having impressed whilst on loan there. Coughlan spent two successful seasons at Livingston before moving back to England to Devon club Plymouth Argyle.

Plymouth Argyle
A highly successful four-year spell at the club followed, with Coughlan a permanent fixture, earning his name in the PFA Division Three team of the year for 2001–02.
He played a key role in Plymouth's Championship-winning teams for Division Three, where he was top goalscorer, and Division Two where he was named as Division Two's Player of the year. Coughlan was voted the club's player of the year in 2002 and was also named in the greatest Plymouth Team by fans to mark the club's first 100 years as a professional club. Coughlan was also Vice-Captain of Plymouth and his influence and stature was missed for nearly two seasons in their defence after he was sold to Sheffield Wednesday which they then managed to fill with Krisztián Timár.

Sheffield Wednesday
In the summer of 2005, he was reunited with former manager Paul Sturrock when he moved back north to newly promoted Sheffield Wednesday for an undisclosed fee. During his first season at the club Graham proved to be a hit with the fans and management alike, earning a regular place in the team and also taking over the role of captain from Lee Bullen whilst the Scot's injury problems regularly kept him out of the team.

On 12 April 2006, Coughlan was named Sheffield Wednesday Player of the Year 2005–06. It was the fifth time Graham has won such an award, having previously being named Player of the Year twice at Livingston and twice at Plymouth.

In March 2007, Coughlan was allowed compassionate leave following the death of his brother.
He missed 5 games, and on his return was made train with the youth team by Brian Laws so he asked to be sent on loan after failing to feature for the first team under new boss Brian Laws. He immediately managed to agree a deal to stay at Burnley until the end of the season. However, he only started one game, the 0–0 draw with Luton Town, before returning to Sheffield Wednesday, where he was told by manager Brian Laws that he had no future at the club, and made available for transfer.

Rotherham United
On 4 July 2007, Coughlan was released by Sheffield Wednesday after being deemed surplus to requirements. Coughlan then signed for Rotherham United on 13 July . He made his debut on 11 August in a 0–0 draw with Hereford United, and was almost ever-present throughout the 2007–08 season. He scored his only goal for Rotherham in a 1–1 draw with Brentford.

Shrewsbury Town
On 30 July 2008, Coughlan signed a two-year contract with Shrewsbury for an undisclosed fee. He scored a goal on his debut, in the 4–0 win over Macclesfield Town on 9 August. In his two years at the club won the captaincy and performed some coaching duties, such as being in charge of Shrewsbury's reserve side which beat Sheffield United 5–0. He was released from his contract on 14 May 2010.

Southend United
On 6 August 2010, Coughlan signed a one-year deal with Southend United, he will also take on the role of reserve team manager. Coughlan made his debut on 10 August 2010 against Bristol City in the League Cup, and his league debut against Port Vale on 21 August 2010. On 13 June 2011, Coughlan signed a two-year contract extension as player/assistant manager. Coughlan's playing contract was due to expire on 30 June 2013. On 20 June 2013, Coughlan signed a new deal to take up the role of first team coach, thus bringing the end to his player career.

Coaching and managerial career

Bristol Rovers
In 2018, Coughlan joined Bristol Rovers as a defensive coach. In December 2018, he was appointed caretaker manager following the departure of Darrell Clarke and Marcus Stewart. In January 2019, he was appointed on a permanent basis after picking up ten points from a possible fifteen over the course of his caretaker spell. At the time of his appointment, Rovers were sitting 19th in the league, only sitting above the relegation zone on goal difference. With the signing of Jonson Clarke-Harris, Rovers saw an upturn of their fortunes and secured their League One status in the penultimate match after a 0–0 draw at Fleetwood Town.

Having been involved in a relegation battle the previous season, Coughlan's upturn of fortunes at the club continued into the start of the 2019–20 season. A 1–0 win over Milton Keynes Dons in October saw his side rise into the play-off positions for the first time in the season. His side returned to these play-off positions in December when they produced a comeback victory to defeat Coughlan's former side Southend United 4–2. With his side 2–0 down at halftime, Coughlan threatened to cancel the players' Christmas party before their spectacular comeback. Rovers climbed to fourth the following Saturday when they won 2–1 away at Ipswich Town, a result overshadowed by the post-match speculation regarding Coughlan's position as manager with rumours he was looking to leave the club. These rumours were proved to be true when, two days later, Rovers issued a statement to confirm that the club had allowed Coughlan to speak to Mansfield Town after two previous approaches that had been rejected.

Mansfield Town
On 17 December 2019, Coughlan decided to accept an offer to become new manager of League Two Mansfield Town. It was reported that it was family reasons that he left, his family being based in South Yorkshire.

On 28 October 2020, Mansfield Town confirmed they had parted ways with Coughlan, after a poor start to the season.

Sheffield United U23
On 22 March 2021, Coughlan joined Sheffield United U23 as a coach until the end of the season, along with Darren Currie.

Newport County
On 20 October 2022, Coughlan was appointed manager of League Two club Newport County on a two-and-a-half year contract with Newport in 19th place in League Two after 14 league matches of the 2022-23 season.

Career statistics
Source:

Managerial statistics

Honours
Livingston
Scottish Football League First Division: 2000–01

Plymouth Argyle
Football League Third Division: 2001–02
Football League Second Division: 2003–04

Individual
PFA Team of the Year: 2001–02 Third Division, 2003–04 Second Division
Plymouth Argyle Player of the Year: 2001–02
PFA Second Division Player of the Year: 2003–04
Sheffield Wednesday Player of the Year: 2005–06

References

External links

1974 births
Living people
Association footballers from Dublin (city)
Republic of Ireland association footballers
Association football defenders
Cherry Orchard F.C. players
Bray Wanderers F.C. players
Blackburn Rovers F.C. players
Swindon Town F.C. players
Livingston F.C. players
Plymouth Argyle F.C. players
Sheffield Wednesday F.C. players
Burnley F.C. players
Rotherham United F.C. players
Shrewsbury Town F.C. players
Southend United F.C. players
Leinster Senior League (association football) players
League of Ireland players
English Football League players
Scottish Football League players
Republic of Ireland expatriate association footballers
Expatriate footballers in England
Irish expatriate sportspeople in England
Republic of Ireland football managers
Bristol Rovers F.C. managers
Mansfield Town F.C. managers
Newport County A.F.C. managers
English Football League managers
Republic of Ireland expatriate football managers
Expatriate football managers in England
Southend United F.C. non-playing staff
Bristol Rovers F.C. non-playing staff
Sheffield United F.C. non-playing staff